Writer Padmabhushan is a 2023 Indian Telugu-language comedy drama film directed by debutant Shanmukha Prasanth. The film features Suhas in the titular role, along with Tina Shilparaj, Rohini and Ashish Vidyarthi. The film was released on 3 February 2023 to positive reviews from critics.

Plot 
Set in Vijayawada, the film revolves around Padmabhushan. Padmabhushan, the only child to his parents is an aspiring writer who publishes his first book with hopes of becoming a famous writer. The twists that follow in his life, how he overcomes all the challenges that come along his way and wins the hand of his love Sarika forms the rest of the story.

Cast 
Suhas as Padmabhushan 
Tina Shilparaj as Sarika
Sri Gouri Priya as Kanna
Rohini as Saraswati, Padmabhushan's mother
Ashish Vidyarthi as Madhusudhan Rao, Padmabhushan's father
Goparaju Ramana as Lokendra Kumar, Sarika's father
Praveen Katari as Saumitri, Padmabhushan’s friend
Ashok Kumar as Baburao, Padmabhushan’s manager
Pragna Kiran as Kanna’s mother

Music 
The film score is composed by Kalyan Nayak, whereas the songs were composed by Shekar Chandra along with the former. The audio rights were acquired by Lahari Music and T-Series. The first song "Kannullo Nee Roopame" was released on 10 July 2022.

Release

Theatrical Release
Writer Padmabhushan was released on 3 February 2023. Geetha Arts acquired the theatrical distribution rights of the film.

Home Video
The satellite and digital streaming rights were sold to Zee Telugu and ZEE5 respectively. It is scheduled for its digital premiere on March 17, 2023.

Reception 
Ram Venkat Srikar of The New Indian Express rated the film 3.5 out of 5 and wrote that "Writer Padmabhushan is not a flawless film. It has some issues craft-wise and writing-wise too but it is the kind of lovely little film that we often see in Malayalam and wish something like that was made here, in our world". A critic from 123Telugu wrote that "On the whole, Writer Padmabhushan is a engaging film that is a perfect blend of humour and sentiment". The Times of India's Neeshita Nyayapati stated that "Writer Padmabhushan is the kind of film that’s perfect to watch with your family", giving a rating of 3 out of 5.

References

External links 

 
 
 Writer Padmabhushan on ZEE5

2023 films
Indian comedy-drama films
2023 comedy-drama films
Films set in Vijayawada
Films shot in Vijayawada
2023 directorial debut films
2020s Telugu-language films